Marshall Allen Neill (August 23, 1914 – October 6, 1979) was a United States district judge of the United States District Court for the Eastern District of Washington.

Education and career

Born in Pullman, Washington, Neill received a Bachelor of Arts degree from Washington State University in 1935 and a Juris Doctor from the University of Idaho College of Law in 1938. He was in private practice in Pullman from 1938 to 1967, serving as city attorney of Pullman from 1939 to 1952. He was a Lieutenant (J.G.) in the United States Navy during World War II, from 1944 to 1946. He was an assistant state attorney general of Washington between 1946 and 1967, and a lecturer at Washington State University from 1946 to 1957. He was a member of the Washington House of Representatives from 1949 to 1956 and of the Washington Senate from 1957 to 1967. He was an associate justice of the Washington Supreme Court from 1967 to 1972.

Federal judicial service

On June 13, 1972, Neill was nominated by President Richard Nixon to a seat on the United States District Court for the Eastern District of Washington vacated by Judge Charles Lawrence Powell. Neill was confirmed by the United States Senate on August 2, 1972, and received his commission on August 9, 1972. He served as Chief Judge from 1973 to 1979. Neill served in that capacity until his death on October 6, 1979.

References

Sources
 

1914 births
1979 deaths
People from Pullman, Washington
Judges of the United States District Court for the Eastern District of Washington
United States district court judges appointed by Richard Nixon
20th-century American judges
Justices of the Washington Supreme Court
Members of the Washington House of Representatives
Washington (state) state senators
United States Navy officers
20th-century American politicians